Amelia Anne Webb (born 23 July 2000), known professionally as Mimi Webb, is a British singer-songwriter. She is known for her singles "Before I Go" and "Good Without", the latter of which peaked at number eight on the UK Singles Chart. In October 2021, she released her debut EP, Seven Shades of Heartbreak, which peaked at number nine in the UK. Her debut studio album, Amelia, was released on 3 March 2023.

Early life 
Webb was born and raised in Canterbury with her parents and brother. She attended the independent school Kent College in Canterbury. She learned guitar and piano, and began to write her own songs at age 13. She credits her piano teacher with encouraging a musical career when she was 15. She cites Adele, Amy Winehouse, Emeli Sandé, and Sam Smith among her influences, along with jazz/pop singers Louis Armstrong, Etta James, Ella Fitzgerald and Nat King Cole.

At 16, she moved to Brighton to attend Brighton Music College (part of the British and Irish Modern Music Institute). She participated with fellow students in musical performances and competitions. She visited Los Angeles in December 2018 with her artist manager to meet with record labels. In February 2019 at the age of 18, she signed with Epic Records.

Career 

At the age of 17, Webb was featured in a song by Young L3X titled "Karma", which also featured Amaan Bradshaw.

Webb released her debut single "Before I Go" in April 2020. The song was featured by Charli D'Amelio on TikTok, gathering over 85 million views on the platform and over 25 million streams on Spotify. Her single "Reasons" was featured on BBC Radio 1, and in June 2021, her single "Good Without" peaked at number eight on the UK Singles Chart. Webb released her debut EP, Seven Shades of Heartbreak, on 22 October 2021.

In November 2021, Webb performed at Hits Live in Liverpool, alongside other artists such as The Script, Mabel, Becky Hill, Joel Corry, Tom Grennan, Ella Henderson and Ed Sheeran.

During March to April 2022, Webb embarked on her first North American tour, opening for Canadian singer Tate McRae.

In June 2022, Webb performed at the Platinum Party at the Palace to celebrate the Platinum Jubilee of Queen Elizabeth II.

In September 2022, Webb toured Australia and New Zealand for the first time, performing in Sydney, Brisbane, Melbourne and Auckland before embarking on a second North America tour for the year which spanned fourteen dates across three weeks, beginning in Vancouver, Canada on 23 September and concluding in Washington DC on 13 October. While on tour, she intended to release the single "Ghost of You" on 16 September, but delayed it by three weeks due to the death of Queen Elizabeth II. On 12 October, Webb announced that her debut album is titled Amelia and would be released on 3 March 2023.

In November 2022, she opened the BBC Children in Need show.

In January 2023, Webb received a nomination for "Best New Talent" ahead of the 2023 Brit Awards. The following day, she released the single "Red Flags".

Webb will embark on the Amelia Tour from March to June 2023, beginning in Madrid, Spain and concluding in Cork, Ireland.

Discography

Studio albums

Extended plays

Singles

Promotional singles

Other charted songs

Notes

References 

2000 births
Living people
Musicians from Kent
21st-century English women singers
21st-century English singers
English women pop singers
Epic Records artists
People from Canterbury
People educated at Kent College